The 1872 Alabama gubernatorial election took place on November 5, 1872, in order to elect the governor of Alabama. Republican David P. Lewis, a former Democrat and Confederate deputy, narrowly defeated former Confederate Army officer Thomas H. Herndon of the Democratic party by a margin of 4.48%. This would be the last time until 1986 in which a Republican was elected governor of Alabama.

Results

References

1872
gubernatorial
Alabama
November 1872 events